Topside Glacier is a cirque glacier, 0.5 nautical miles (0.9 km) long, descending the south wall of Elkhorn Ridge in Greenville Valley, Convoy Range, Victoria Land. The name is a nautical approximation of the situation of the glacier. Named by a 1989-90 New Zealand Antarctic Research Program (NZARP) field party to the area.

Glaciers of Scott Coast